Fleur East (born 29 October 1987) is an English singer-songwriter, rapper and radio presenter on Hits Radio. She competed on the second series of the televised singing competition The X Factor in 2005 as a member of the girl group Addictiv Ladies. In 2012, she then launched a solo career with the record label Strictly Rhythm and released songs with dance musicians including DJ Fresh and Drumsound & Bassline Smith. East returned to The X Factor as a solo artist in 2014 for its eleventh series, where she finished in second place behind Ben Haenow.

East became The X Factors first contestant to reach number one on the UK iTunes Store chart during the competition with her performance of "Uptown Funk" (originally by Mark Ronson featuring Bruno Mars). In 2015, she signed to Syco Music and released her debut studio album, Love, Sax and Flashbacks (2015). It was proceded by the lead single "Sax" which reached number 3 in the UK and received a platinum certification. East released her second studio album Fearless (2020). Since then, she has competed in I'm a Celebrity...Get Me Out of Here! and Strictly Come Dancing (2022), as well as presenting on Hits Radio.

Early life
Fleur East was born on 29 October 1987 to an English father and a Ghanaian mother. She was raised in Walthamstow, London. She has family living in Yorkshire and she has a younger sister named Keshia, a make-up professional. She attended Holy Family Technology College in Walthamstow and Queen Mary University of London, where she studied journalism and contemporary history. In an interview with the Daily Mirror, East said she was the victim of racism in childhood, with one child asking her, "Are you black or white?"

Career

2005–2013: The X Factor, Addictiv Ladies and independent releases

East was in the girl group Addictiv Ladies, who were on series 2 of The X Factor in 2005, mentored by Simon Cowell, but were eliminated in week 1 after ending up in the bottom two with Chico Slimani. She was introduced to drum-and-bass producer DJ Fresh through her manager in 2011, and Fresh subsequently hired her as a vocalist for a BBC Radio 1 Live Lounge session of his. In 2012, she featured on Fresh's song "Turn It Up" from his album Nextlevelism and toured extensively with him in 2012, including performances at T4 on the Beach, V Festival and the iTunes Festival.

East signed to the record label Strictly Rhythm in January 2012 and released two singles as the lead artist (credited as Fleur): "Broken Mirror" with Cutline and "Turn the Lights On" (produced by Culture Shock). She also featured on "The One" by Horx and P3000. In 2013, she featured on Drumsound & Bassline Smith's "One in a Million", which entered the UK Singles Chart at number 53, and headlined the Miss Face of Africa EU ceremony in London. In December 2013, she self-released her debut EP She for free download. One of the EP tracks, "Super Rich Royals", is a mashup cover of "Super Rich Kids" by Frank Ocean and "Royals" by Lorde.

East worked as a waitress at the London nightclub Aura Mayfair to help support her music career, and was also a fitness model with the agency W Athletic, but struggled with her finances. She later said that by early 2014, she was "definitely depressed" and considered ending her music career, until her friends and relatives encouraged her to re-audition for The X Factor.

2014: Return to The X Factor

In June 2014, East auditioned for the eleventh series of The X Factor. She sang John Legend's "Ordinary People" in her room audition, where she received three "yes" votes and progressed through to the arena auditions. She sang Chris Brown's "Fine China" at the arena and progressed to the boot camp stage with four "yes" votes. East made it past the six chair challenge and through to the judges' houses stage in the "Over 26s" category, mentored by Cowell once again, to whom she performed "Bang Bang" by Jessie J, Ariana Grande and Nicki Minaj. Cowell chose East for the live shows, alongside Jay James and eventual winner Ben Haenow.

In the semi-final of the live shows, East performed "Uptown Funk" by Mark Ronson featuring Bruno Mars, a rendition The Guardians Stuart Heritage described as "truly astonishing [...] Fleur barged in and left the competition in ruins. It was two minutes and 53 seconds of all-out attack; possibly the biggest moment that any [Simon] Cowell show has produced since we first met Susan Boyle, only this was even more surprising because we already knew Fleur, and this far she'd merely been adequate." Popjustice declared it "the most exciting moment of the entire series [...] Whichever act wins The X Factor this coming weekend, Fleur's now established herself as the one who deserves and will undoubtedly get The Full Ella (FKA The Full Leona) when it comes to career rollout." East's version went to number one on the UK iTunes Store, which led the original song to be released five weeks earlier than planned; it subsequently reached number one on the UK Singles Chart. In the final, the show's final, East was announced as the runner-up in the competition, losing to fellow category act, Ben Haenow with 34.3% of the votes to Haenow's 57.2%.

2015–2017: Love, Sax and Flashbacks
In January 2015, East announced that she had signed to Cowell's record label Syco Music. She recorded her debut album with musicians including Wayne Hector, The Invisible Men, Jack Splash, and TMS. She announced in July 2015 that she had been working on her first fashion collection with women's fashion brand Lipsy London. "Sax", the lead single from her debut album, was released in November 2015 and reached number three in the UK. Her debut album, titled Love, Sax and Flashbacks, was released on 4 December. On 22 January, East released the single "More and More". She performed the single at the National Television Awards. In 2016, East signed with Columbia Records to launch her international music career.

In October 2017, it was revealed that East and Syco had parted ways after three years via mutual agreement.

2018–2020: I'm a Celebrity...Get Me Out of Here! and return to music
On 12 November 2018, East was announced as participating in that year's series of I'm a Celebrity...Get Me Out of Here!. East finished in fourth place on 8 December 2018. Later that month, East announced via Instagram that she would be releasing her first single in four years, "Favourite Thing". The single was released on 4 January 2019 in addition to the music video release on YouTube. East also performed the song live for the first time on television on This Morning.

In June 2019, Bauer Media announced that East would take over hosting the breakfast show on national radio station, Hits Radio alongside co-hosts James Barr and Greg Burns. The first show aired on 12 July 2019. On 7 September 2019, East started hosting the Saturday Morning show 9am-12noon across the Hits Radio Network.

On 18 November 2019, East released her new single, "Size".  The single was featured in the Debenhams Christmas ad campaign. East released her new single "Lucky" on 31 January 2020 along with its official music video. The video was shot over a period of six months and includes footage from East's travels around the world.

East's second album Fearless was released on 20 March 2020. East appeared on the sixteenth, seventeenth, eighteenth and nineteenth of Ant & Dec's Saturday Night Takeaway where she would go to an area of the UK and give tickets to people for a 'Takeaway Getaway' holiday from TUI. She released the official NHS charity single "Not Alone" on 9 April 2020 with 100% of the profits going towards the  COVID-19 NHS appeal. The single premiered on The One Show alongside its official music video.

2022: Strictly Come Dancing
Throughout the summer of 2022, East performed at Butlin's. Later that year, she was announced as a contestant on the twentieth series of Strictly Come Dancing where she was partnered with Vito Coppola. Despite surviving 4 dance offs, the most any contestant has survived alongside Jamelia, Jamie Laing, and fellow series 20 contestant Molly Rainford, she achieved the first perfect 40 in Blackpool for her Couple’s Choice, and finished as a series runners-up.

Musical style
East describes her music as "urban-inspired with a few twists" and lists Michael Jackson, Alicia Keys, Rihanna, Sade, Emeli Sandé, Jessie Ware, and Florence Welch  among her inspirations. East's early solo work was heavily influenced by drum and bass artists including Netsky and Matrix & Futurebound.

Personal life
East has been in a relationship with French celebrity fashion designer Marcel Badiane-Robin since 2010. The two first met in a bar in 2009 where Marcel was working as a waiter, but East was not single at the time. A year later they reconnected and started dating. They got married in Morocco in 2019.

Discography

 Love, Sax and Flashbacks (2015)
 Fearless (2020)

See also
 List of I'm a Celebrity...Get Me Out of Here! (British TV series) contestants
 List of Strictly Come Dancing contestants
 List of The X Factor (British TV series) finalists

References

External links
 
 Hits Radio Breakfast with Fleur East on Hits Radio
 Saturday Mornings with Fleur East on Hits Radio

1987 births
Alumni of Queen Mary University of London
21st-century Black British women singers
Black British women rappers
English dance musicians
English drum and bass musicians
English people of Ghanaian descent
British contemporary R&B singers
English soul singers
Living people
People from Walthamstow
Rappers from London
Singers from London
Sony BMG artists
The X Factor (British TV series) contestants
English women pop singers
Feminist musicians
I'm a Celebrity...Get Me Out of Here! (British TV series) participants